Thomas Moody (born 4 December 1973) is a businessman, and the Managing Director of P&G Northern Europe, with responsibility for all of P&G in the UK.

Early life
He studied International Business and Modern Languages (4 years) at Aston University.

Career

P&G
He joined P&G straight from university. He became Managing Director for P&G in Northern Europe in 2015.

Personal life
He is married with three children and lives in Surrey.

See also
 Procter & Gamble on Tyneside
 Gina Boswell, Head of Unilever UK & Ireland since 2015

References

External links
 P&G

1973 births
Alumni of Aston University
Procter & Gamble people
Living people